Telstar 12V (Telstar 12 Vantage) is a communication satellite in the Telstar series of the Canadian satellite communications company Telesat. The satellite was the first dedicated commercial payload of the Japanese H-IIA launch vehicle.

References

Telstar satellites
Spacecraft launched in 2015
2015 in spaceflight
2015 in Canada
Satellites using the Eurostar bus
Spacecraft launched by H-II rockets
Communications satellites in geostationary orbit